Stictigramma is a genus of moths of the family Erebidae. The genus was erected by George Hampson in 1926.

Species
Stictigramma kasyi Wiltshire, 1971
Stictigramma leechi Wileman, 1915
Stictigramma limbata Wileman, 1915
Stictigramma lobbichleri Wiltshire, 1968
Stictigramma steniptera Hampson, 1926 New Guinea

References

Calpinae